Bloody Moon (The Saw of Death) is a 1981 English-language Spanish-German slasher film directed by Jesús Franco and starring Olivia Pascal.

Plot 
Miguel, a young man with a horribly disfigured face, attempts to trick a girl into sex by putting a mask on and pretending to be her boyfriend. When she unmasks him, he brutally stabs the young woman with a pair of scissors. After the crimes, Miguel is institutionalized at a mental asylum for five years. When his sentence is finished, he is released into the care of his sister, Manuela. Along with their invalid aunt and countess Maria Gonzales, his incestuous sister Manuela operates a boarding school for young women called Europe's International Youth-Club Boarding School of Languages on the Spanish resort of Costa Del Sol.

When Miguel rides the train ride from the sanitarium, he spots a long-haired brunette woman named Angela. Meanwhile, professor Alvaro arrives at the school to visit Manuela, in which Maria states that she is being plotted against and that Manuela only wants money. That night, Maria lies in bed before she is burned to death with a torch. Angela arrives at the school later than her friends and stays in the room where Miguel killed the girl. While wiping the bathroom mirror, she sees Miguel reflected before running outside, where the man follows her. She is then cared for by her friend Inga, and the two go to visit Laura, Eva, and the gardener Antonio. Miguel goes to see his sister, and he proclaims his love to Manuela; the two kiss and touch. Manuela stops him, reminding him of the incident years earlier and citing that nobody understands them.

After a night at the disco, Antonio walks Angela home and reads in bed. While the killer sneaks inside the room, Eva appears at her window and asks to borrow a pullover. While Eva changes, the killer attacks and pierces a long knife into her back, which is then forced out of her breast just before she dies. The next day in Alvaro's Spanish class, the class listens to Spanish dialect tapes. On Angela's tape, the voice suddenly changes and threatens to cut her with a hacksaw. She screams when she sees Miguel at the window but disappears when Alvaro returns, and the tape resumes back to its lessons. After finding bloody clothing at Eva's place, Angela sees Antonio arguing with Manuela before a boulder rolls down a hill and nearly kills Angela. While Manuela notices one of her snakes is missing, Angela asks around for Eva before seeing Antonio killing a snake with garden shears and runs. While Antonio tries to stop her, Alvaro appears and tells her to stop bothering his students.

Laura and her friends go to Angela's room, where Inga feigns a sexual act inside. While she does not notice the dead Eva hanging in the closet, the girls see Inga through the window and laugh at her. Outside, Angela sees Inga drive back in a yellow car, similar to the one Manuela drove. The masked killer takes Inga somewhere, as she has accompanied the person willingly, where she is tied with rope. The killer turns on a saw and pushes Inga towards it. After a young boy turns off the machine, the saw is turned back on and decapitates Inga, before the killer chases the boy in the car and runs over him.

Meanwhile, Angela packs in her room, where she sees Antonio at the front door and Miguel at the window; she panics and barricades herself in the room. She then lets Laura inside and offers to stay for the night, where she goes to the disco club to grab some drinks. When Laura returns, the killer crushes her neck with an iron collar. After receiving a threatening phone call, Angela finds the dead bodies of her friends and is attacked by the killer. While Miguel is knocked out during the struggle, the girl sees Alvaro driving off in his car. Angela runs to Manuela and tells her about the bodies. Manuela takes her to a room and gives her a drink to relax her.

Manuela and Alvaro discuss the killings he has done, and an awakened Miguel hears them talk of blaming the murders on him, all for the sake of Manuela retaining the family inheritance. Manuela also talks of how Miguel thinks she loves him and mentions his disfigurement. She tells Alvaro that she has already been paid and tells him to kill Angela. Miguel goes to a room and, eventually believing that Angela is his sister, chokes the blonde until she shoves a spike into his neck. Angela runs downstairs and sees Alvaro and Manuela struggling before screaming at the body of the countess Maria found inside a room. Alvaro runs into the room and holds a knife to Angela, but Manuela appears and murders Alvaro with a hedge cutter; she puts the blade to Angela's throat and reminds her that she saved her life, where Angela nods and runs away. Manuela then goes to her room and talks to her dead brother, but Miguel sits up and strangles Manuela. The film ends with Miguel collapsing and holding onto his sister's hand while Antonio embraces Angela as the police arrive.

Cast

Production
Bloody Moon was a "work-for-hire" production for Jesús Franco. 
Franco has stated that Rayo Casablanca, who is credited as the screenwriter of the film was actually production manager Erich Tomek.

Release 
Bloody Moon was released in West Germany on March 27, 1981.

The film was made available on DVD for the first time in the United States by Severin Films in 2008. This version restores all of the gore scenes, including the infamous circular saw, beheading scene.

Reception 
In a contemporary review, Tom Milne reviewed the film in the Monthly Film Bulletin. Milne described the film as "appallingly meretricious schlock which looks as if it has been slung together using discarded out-takes from a dozen different potboilers" and that the film has "no visible means of support from either plot or characterization, the action simply staggers from one lurid climax to next".

Bloody Moon was received favourably by DVD Verdict. Tim Lucas described Bloody Moon as "not one of Franco's better movies" and stated that the film "compares well to the shoddiness of American examples of the same period such as Prom Night, Bloody Birthday and the ''Friday the 13th films.

References

Sources

External links 

1981 films
1981 horror films
1980s slasher films
West German films
1980s German-language films
English-language German films
English-language Spanish films
Films directed by Jesús Franco
Films scored by Gerhard Heinz
German slasher films
German serial killer films
1980s teen horror films
Films set in Spain
Spanish slasher films
German splatter films
Spanish splatter films
1980s English-language films
1980s German films